Bril is a surname. Notable people with the surname include:

Ben Bril, Dutch boxer
Joel Bril, pen name of Joel Löwe
Matthaeus Bril, Flemish painter
Paul Bril, Flemish painter, brother of Matthaeus

See also
 Brill (disambiguation)
 Brühl (disambiguation)